Eddington is a small town on the Loddon River in Central Victoria, Australia.

There is a bridge over the Loddon at Eddington, built during 1928-30 to replace a 19th-century example that tended to be swept away by seasonal floods.

One of Eddington's claims to fame is that the rescue team that set out to look for the ill-fated Burke and Wills party in the 19th century camped there overnight.

While there were facilities including a brewery, cheese factory, butter factory, several hotels, race course and Churches during the second half of the 19th century, Eddington's population would be  96 today .

Today there is an active Golf Club, a Community Centre and live steam model engineering society. There are two former hotels, a former general store, former police station and lockup, former primary school and former garage. The Loddon River at Eddington is actually the upper reach of Laanecoorie Weir.

A cafe operating limited hours also operates out of the old service station premises on the main road.

References

External links

 Danns Bridge, from the Victorian Heritage Database
 Eddington. Victoria. Australia website, from the friends of Eddington

Towns in Victoria (Australia)
Shire of Loddon